Timotei Seviciu (born Traian Petru Sevici  on 4 June 1936 in Timișoara) is a hierarch of the Romanian Orthodox Church, since 1984 the bishop and since 2009 the archbishop of the Arad Archdiocese.

References

Bishops of the Romanian Orthodox Church
1936 births
Living people